The Mather Building, also known as Franklin & DeHaven Jewelers, was a historic commercial building located at Parkersburg, Wood County, West Virginia.  It was built in 1898, and was a three- to four-story, red brick and sandstone building in the Classical style. The interior featured a fine tin ceiling and a built-in vault.

It was listed on the National Register of Historic Places in 1982, and demolished on June 23, 2018.

References

Buildings and structures in Parkersburg, West Virginia
Commercial buildings on the National Register of Historic Places in West Virginia
Neoclassical architecture in West Virginia
Commercial buildings completed in 1898
National Register of Historic Places in Wood County, West Virginia
1898 establishments in West Virginia
Demolished buildings and structures in West Virginia
Buildings and structures demolished in 2018